German literature comprises those literary texts written in the German language. This includes literature written in Germany, Austria, the German parts of Switzerland and Belgium, Liechtenstein, Luxembourg, South Tyrol in Italy and to a lesser extent works of the German diaspora. German literature of the modern period is mostly in Standard German, but there are some currents of literature influenced to a greater or lesser degree by dialects (e.g. Alemannic).

Medieval German literature is literature written in Germany, stretching from the Carolingian dynasty; various dates have been given for the end of the German literary Middle Ages, the Reformation (1517) being the last possible cut-off point. The Old High German period is reckoned to run until about the mid-11th century; the most famous works are the Hildebrandslied and a heroic epic known as the Heliand. Middle High German starts in the 12th century; the key works include The Ring (ca. 1410) and the poems of Oswald von Wolkenstein and Johannes von Tepl. The Baroque period (1600 to 1720) was one of the most fertile times in German literature. Modern literature in German begins with the authors of the Enlightenment (such as Herder). The Sensibility movement of the 1750s–1770s ended with Goethe's best-selling The Sorrows of Young Werther (1774). The Sturm und Drang  and Weimar Classicism movements were led by Johann Wolfgang von Goethe and Friedrich Schiller. German Romanticism was the dominant movement of the late 18th and early 19th centuries.

Biedermeier refers to the literature, music, the visual arts and interior design in the period between the years 1815 (Vienna Congress), the end of the Napoleonic Wars, and 1848, the year of the European revolutions. Under the Nazi regime, some authors went into exile (Exilliteratur) and others submitted to censorship ("internal emigration", Innere Emigration). The Nobel Prize in Literature has been awarded to German language authors fourteen times (as of 2020), or the second most often, tying with French language authors, after English language authors (with 32 laureates) with winners including Thomas Mann, Hermann Hesse, Günter Grass, and Peter Handke.

Periodization

Periodization is not an exact science but the following list contains movements or time periods typically used in discussing German literature. It seems worth noting that the periods of medieval German literature span two or three centuries, those of early modern German literature span one century, and those of modern German literature each span one or two decades. The closer one nears the present, the more debated the periodizations become.

 Medieval German literature
 Old High German literature (750–1050)
 Middle High German literature (1050–1350)
 Late medieval / Renaissance (1350–1500)
 Early Modern German literature (see Early Modern literature)
 Humanism and Protestant Reformation (1500–1650)
 Baroque (1600–1720)
 Enlightenment (1680–1789)
 Modern German literature
 18th- and 19th-century German literature
 Empfindsamkeit / Sensibility (1750s–1770s)
 Sturm und Drang / Storm and Stress (1760s–1780s)
 German Classicism (1729–1832)
 Weimar Classicism (1788–1805) or (1788–1832), depending on Schiller's (1805) or Goethe's (1832) death
 German Romanticism (1790s–1880s)
 Biedermeier (1815–1848)
 Young Germany (1830–1850)
 Poetic Realism (1848–1890)
 Naturalism (1880–1900)
 20th-century German literature
 1900–1933
 Fin de siècle (c. 1900)
 Symbolism
 Expressionism (1910–1920)
 Dada (1914–1924)
 New Objectivity (Neue Sachlichkeit)
 Well Known Writers of the 20th Century
 1933–1945
 National Socialist literature
 Exile literature
 1945–1989
 By country
 Federal Republic of Germany
 German Democratic Republic
 Austria
 Switzerland
 Other
 By thematic or group
 Post-war literature (1945–1967)
 Group 47
 Holocaust literature
 Contemporary German literature (1989–)

Middle Ages
Medieval German literature refers to literature written in Germany, stretching from the Carolingian dynasty; various dates have been given for the end of the German literary Middle Ages, the Reformation (1517) being the last possible cut-off point.

Old High German

The Old High German period is reckoned to run until about the mid-11th century, though the boundary to Early Middle High German (second half of the 11th century) is not clear-cut.

The most famous work in OHG is the Hildebrandslied, a short piece of Germanic alliterative heroic verse which besides the Muspilli is the sole survivor of what must have been a vast oral tradition. Another important work, in the northern dialect of Old Saxon, is a life of Christ in the style of a heroic epic known as the Heliand.

Middle High German

Middle High German proper runs from the beginning of the 12th century, and in the second half of the 12th century, there was a sudden intensification of activity, leading to a 60-year "golden age" of medieval German literature referred to as the mittelhochdeutsche Blütezeit (1170–1230). This was the period of the blossoming of MHG lyric poetry, particularly Minnesang (the German variety of the originally French tradition of courtly love). One of the most important of these poets was Walther von der Vogelweide. The same sixty years saw the composition of the most important courtly romances. These are written in rhyming couplets, and again draw on French models such as Chrétien de Troyes, many of them relating Arthurian material, for example, Parzival by Wolfram von Eschenbach. The third literary movement of these years was a new revamping of the heroic tradition, in which the ancient Germanic oral tradition can still be discerned, but tamed and Christianized and adapted for the court. These high medieval heroic epics are written in rhymed strophes, not the alliterative verse of Germanic prehistory (for example, the Nibelungenlied).

The Middle High German period is conventionally taken to end in 1350, while the Early New High German is taken to begin with the German Renaissance, after the invention of movable type in the mid-15th century. Therefore, the literature of the late 14th and the early 15th century falls, as it were, in the cracks between Middle and New High German, and can be classified as either. Works of this transitional period include The Ring (c. 1410), the poems of Oswald von Wolkenstein and Johannes von Tepl, the German versions of Pontus and Sidonia, and arguably the works of Hans Folz and Sebastian Brant (Ship of Fools, 1494), among others. The Volksbuch (chapbook) tradition which would flourish in the 16th century also finds its origin in the second half of the 15th century.

Early Modern period

German Renaissance and Reformation

 Sebastian Brant (1457–1521)
 Thomas Murner (1475–1537)
 Martin Luther (1483–1546)
 Philipp Melanchthon (1497–1560)
 Sebastian Franck (1500–1543)

Baroque period

The Baroque period (1600 to 1720) was one of the most fertile times in German literature. Many writers reflected the horrible experiences of the Thirty Years' War, in poetry and prose. Grimmelshausen's adventures of the young and naïve Simplicissimus, in the eponymous book Simplicius Simplicissimus, became the most famous novel of the Baroque period. Martin Opitz established rules for the "purity" of language, style, verse and rhyme. Andreas Gryphius and Daniel Caspar von Lohenstein wrote German language tragedies, or Trauerspiele, often on Classical themes and frequently quite violent. Erotic, religious and occasional poetry appeared in both German and Latin. Sibylle Ursula von Braunschweig-Lüneburg wrote part of a novel, Die Durchlauchtige Syrerin Aramena (Aramena, the noble Syrian lady), which when complete would be the most famous courtly novel in German Baroque literature; it was finished by her brother Anton Ulrich and edited by Sigmund von Birken.

18th century

The Enlightenment

Sensibility
Empfindsamkeit / Sensibility  (1750s–1770s)
Friedrich Gottlieb Klopstock (1724–1803), Christian Fürchtegott Gellert (1715–1769), Sophie de La Roche (1730–1807). The period culminates and ends in Goethe's best-selling Die Leiden des jungen Werther (1774).

Sturm und Drang

Sturm und Drang  (the conventional translation is "Storm and Stress"; a more literal translation, however, might be storm and urge, storm and longing, or storm and impulse) is the name of a movement in German literature and music taking place from the late 1760s through the early 1780s in which individual subjectivity and, in particular, extremes of emotion were given free expression in response to the confines of rationalism imposed by the Enlightenment and associated aesthetic movements. The philosopher Johann Georg Hamann is considered to be the ideologue of Sturm und Drang, and Johann Wolfgang von Goethe was a notable proponent of the movement, though he and Friedrich Schiller ended their period of association with it, initiating what would become Weimar Classicism.

19th century

German Classicism

Weimar Classicism (German “Weimarer Klassik” and “Weimarer Klassizismus”) is a cultural and literary movement of Europe, and its central ideas were originally propounded by Johann Wolfgang von Goethe and Johann Christoph Friedrich von Schiller during the period 1786 to 1805.

Romanticism
German Romanticism was the dominant movement of the late 18th and early 19th centuries. German Romanticism developed relatively late compared to its English counterpart, coinciding in its early years with the movement known as German Classicism or Weimar Classicism, which it opposed.  In contrast to the seriousness of English Romanticism, the German variety is notable for valuing humor and wit as well as beauty. The early German romantics tried to create a new synthesis of art, philosophy, and science, looking to the Middle Ages as a simpler, more integrated period.  As time went on, however, they became increasingly aware of the tenuousness of the unity they were seeking.  Later German Romanticism emphasized the tension between the everyday world and the seemingly irrational and supernatural projections of creative genius. Heinrich Heine in particular criticized the tendency of the early romantics to look to the medieval past for a model of unity in art and society.
 G.W.F. Hegel
 E.T.A. Hoffmann
 Friedrich Hölderlin
 Heinrich von Kleist
 Novalis (Friedrich von Hardenberg)
 Friedrich Schlegel
 August Wilhelm Schlegel
 Friedrich Schleiermacher
 Ludwig Tieck
 Ludwig Uhland
Arthur Schopenhauer
 Joseph von Eichendorff

Biedermeier and Vormärz
Biedermeier refers to work in the fields of literature, music, the visual arts and interior design in the period between the years 1815 (Vienna Congress), the end of the Napoleonic Wars, and 1848, the year of the European revolutions and contrasts with the Romantic era which preceded it. Typical Biedermeier poets are Annette von Droste-Hülshoff, Adelbert von Chamisso, Eduard Mörike, and Wilhelm Müller, the last three named having well-known musical settings by Robert Schumann, Hugo Wolf and Franz Schubert respectively.

Young Germany (Junges Deutschland) was a loose group of Vormärz writers which existed from about 1830 to 1850. It was essentially a youth movement (similar to those that had swept France and Ireland and originated in Italy). Its main proponents were Karl Gutzkow, Heinrich Laube, Theodor Mundt and Ludolf Wienbarg; Heinrich Heine, Ludwig Börne and Georg Büchner were also considered part of the movement. The wider circle included Willibald Alexis, Adolf Glassbrenner and Gustav Kühne.

Realism and Naturalism
Poetic Realism (1848–1890): Theodor Fontane, Gustav Freitag, Gottfried Keller, Wilhelm Raabe, Adalbert Stifter, Theodor Storm

Naturalism (1880–1900): Gerhart Hauptmann

20th century

1900 to 1933
 Fin de siècle (c. 1900)
 Weimar literature (1919–1933)
 Symbolism
 Expressionism (1910–1920)
 Dada (1914–1924)
 New Objectivity (Neue Sachlichkeit)

Well known writers of the 20th century
A well-known writer of German literature was Franz Kafka. A Kafka novel, The Trial, was ranked #3 on Le Monde's 100 Books of the Century. Kafka's iconic writing style that captures themes of bureaucracy and existentialism resulted in the coining of the term “Kafkaesque.” Kafka's writing allowed a peek into his melancholic life, one where he felt isolated from all human beings, one of his inspirations for writing.

Nazi Germany
National Socialist literature: see Blut und Boden, Nazi propaganda

Under the Nazi regime, some authors went into exile (Exilliteratur) and others submitted to censorship ("inner emigration", Innere Emigration)

Inner Emigration: Gottfried Benn, Werner Bergengruen, Hans Blüher, Hans Heinrich Ehrler, Hans Fallada, Werner Finck, Gertrud Fussenegger, Ricarda Huch, Ernst Jünger, Erich Kästner, Volker Lachmann, Oskar Loerke, Erika Mitterer, Walter von Molo, Friedrich Reck-Malleczewen, Richard Riemerschmid, Reinhold Schneider, Frank Thiess, Carl von Ossietzky, Ernst Wiechert
 in exile: Ernst Bloch, Bertolt Brecht, Hermann Broch, Alfred Döblin, Lion Feuchtwanger, Bruno Frank, A. M. Frey, Anna Gmeyner, Oskar Maria Graf, Hermann Hesse, Heinrich Eduard Jacob, Hermann Kesten, Annette Kolb, Siegfried Kracauer, Emil Ludwig, Heinrich Mann, Klaus Mann, Thomas Mann, Balder Olden, Rudolf Olden, Robert Neumann, Erich Maria Remarque, Ludwig Renn, Alice Rühle-Gerstel, Otto Rühle, Alice Schwarz-Gardos, Anna Seghers, B. Traven, Bodo Uhse, Franz Werfel, Arnold Zweig, Stefan Zweig, Joseph Roth.

1945 to 1989
 Post-war literature of West Germany (1945–1967): Heinrich Böll, Günter Grass, Group 47; Holocaust literature (Paul Celan, Edgar Hilsenrath)
 GDR Literature in East Germany: Johannes R. Becher, Wolf Biermann, Bertolt Brecht, Sarah Kirsch, Günter Kunert, Reiner Kunze, Heiner Müller, Anna Seghers, Christa Wolf 
 Postwar literature of Switzerland and Austria: Ingeborg Bachmann, Thomas Bernhard, Friedrich Dürrenmatt, Max Frisch, Elfriede Jelinek, Peter Handke
 Postmodern literature: Christian Kracht, Hans Wollschläger, Christoph Ransmayr, Marlene Streeruwitz, Rainald Goetz, Clemens J. Setz, Oswald Wiener
 W.G. Sebald

21st century

Much of contemporary poetry in the German language is published in literary magazines. DAS GEDICHT, for instance, has featured German poetry from Germany, Austria, Switzerland, and Luxemburg for the last twenty years.

Science-Fiction, Fantasy: Andreas Eschbach, Frank Schätzing, Wolfgang Hohlbein, Bernhard Hennen, Walter Moers
Pop Literature: Benjamin von Stuckrad-Barre
Migrant literature: Wladimir Kaminer, Feridun Zaimoglu, Rafik Schami
Poetry: Jürgen Becker, Marcel Beyer, Theo Breuer, Rolf Dieter Brinkmann, Marc Engelhard, Hans Magnus Enzensberger, Aldona Gustas, Ernst Jandl, Thomas Kling, Uwe Kolbe, Friederike Mayröcker, Durs Grünbein, Kurt Marti, Karl Krolow, Elke Erb
Aphorists: Hans Kruppa
Thriller: Ingrid Noll
Novel: Wilhelm Genazino, Günter Grass, Herta Müller, Siegfried Lenz, Charlotte Link, Rainald Goetz, Anna Kaleri, Norbert Scheuer, Dietmar Dath, Christian Kracht, Kathrin Schmidt, Burkhard Spinnen, Robert Menasse, Martin Walser, Andreas Mand, Zsuzsa Bánk, Marc Degens, Jenny Erpenbeck, Klaus Modick, Peter Handke, Elfriede Jelinek, Daniel Kehlmann
 Literaturport (in German): audio clips of contemporary literature, many read out by the authors themselves
 German-American literature: Paul-Henri Campbell, Walter Abish

Nobel Prize laureates

The Nobel Prize in Literature has been awarded to German-language authors fourteen times (as of 2020), tying with French-language authors, or the second most often after English-language authors (with 32).

The following writers are from Germany unless stated otherwise:

1902 Theodor Mommsen
1908 Rudolf Christoph Eucken
1910 Paul Heyse
1912 Gerhart Hauptmann
1919 Carl Spitteler (Swiss)
1929 Thomas Mann
1946 Hermann Hesse
1966 Nelly Sachs
1972 Heinrich Böll
1981 Elias Canetti (Bulgarian, later British)
1999 Günter Grass
2004 Elfriede Jelinek (Austrian)
2009 Herta Müller (Romanian by birth, later naturalized in West Germany)
2019 Peter Handke (Austrian)

See also

 Goethe-Institut
 German-speaking Europe
 Swiss literature
 Austrian literature
 Stiftung Lesen
 History of German
 List of German-language authors 
 List of German-language playwrights
 List of German-language poets
 List of German-language philosophers
 History of literature
 Sophie (digital lib)
 Luso-Germanic Literature
 Kindler literature encyclopedia
 Media of Germany
 Books in Germany

References

Literature

English
Cambridge History of German Literature. Watanabe-O’Kelly, Helen, ed. Cambridge and New York: Cambridge University Press, 1997.
Konzett, Matthias Piccolruaz. Encyclopedia of German Literature. Routledge, 2000.
The Oxford Companion to German Literature, ed. by Mary Garland and Henry Garland, 3rd edition, Oxford University Press, 1997
 Grange, William, ed. Historical dictionary of German literature to 1945 (2011) online

German
Bernd Lutz, Benedikt Jeßing (eds.): Metzler Lexikon Autoren: Deutschsprachige Dichter und Schriftsteller vom Mittelalter bis zur Gegenwart, Stuttgart und Weimar: 4., aktualisierte und erweiterte Auflage 2010
Theo Breuer, Aus dem Hinterland. Lyrik nach 2000, Sistig/Eifel : Edition YE, 2005, 
 Theo Breuer, Kiesel & Kastanie (ed.): Von neuen Gedichten und Geschichten, Sistig/Eifel : Edition YE, 2008, 
Jürgen Brocan, Jan Kuhlbrodt (eds.), Umkreisungen. 25 Auskünfte zum Gedicht, Leipzig: Poetenladen Literaturverlag, 2010
Manfred Enzensperger (ed.), Die Hölderlin-Ameisen: Vom Finden und Erfinden der Poesie, Cologne: Dumont, 2005
Peter von Matt, Die verdächtige Pracht. Über Dichter und Gedichte, Munich [etc.] : Hanser, 1998
Joachim Sartorius (ed.), Mimima Poetica. Für eine Poetik des zeitgenössischen Gedichts, Cologne : Kiepenheuer & Witsch, 1999

Anthologies
German poetry from 1750 to 1900, ed. by Robert M. Browning. Foreword by Michael Hamburger,  New York : Continuum, 1984, 281 pp. (German Library), 
Twentieth-Century German Poetry: An Anthology, edited by Michael Hofmann, New York: Farrar, Straus, and Giroux, 2008 (Paperback Edition), 544 pp., 
Heinz Ludwig Arnold (ed.), TEXT+KRITIK: Lyrik des 20. Jahrhunderts (1999).
Verena Auffermann, Hubert Winkels (ed.), Beste Deutsche Erzähler (2000–)
Hans Bender (ed.), In diesem Lande leben wir. Deutsche Gedichte der Gegenwart (1978)
Hans Bender, Was sind das für Zeiten. Deutschsprachige Gedichte der achtziger Jahre (1988)
Christoph Buchwald, Uljana Wolf (ed.), Jahrbuch der Lyrik 2009 (2009)
Karl Otto Conrady (ed.), Der Große Conrady. Das Buch deutscher Gedichte. Von den Anfängen bis zur Gegenwart (2008).
Hugo von Hofmannsthal (ed.), Deutsche Erzähler I (1912, 1979)
Marie Luise Kaschnitz (ed.), Deutsche Erzähler II (1971, 1979)
Boris Kerenski & Sergiu Stefanescu, Kaltland Beat. Neue deutsche Szene (1999)
Axel Kutsch (ed.), Versnetze. Deutschsprachige Lyrik der Gegenwart (2009)
 Andreas Neumeister, Marcel Hartges (ed.), Poetry! Slam! Texte der Pop-Fraktion (1996)

External links
 
 Sophie – A digital library of works by German-speaking women